The Alger–Sullivan Lumber Company Residential Historic District is a historic district in Century, Florida. On September 28, 1989, it was added to the U.S. National Register of Historic Places.

References

External links
 Escambia County listings at National Register of Historic Places
Alger–Sullivan Historical Society

National Register of Historic Places in Escambia County, Florida
Historic districts on the National Register of Historic Places in Florida
1989 establishments in Florida